"Customer Survey" is the seventh episode of the fifth season of the television series The Office, and the show's seventy-ninth episode overall. The episode aired in the United States on November 6, 2008, on NBC. This episode was written by Lester Lewis and directed by Stephen Merchant, co-creator, writer and director (along with Ricky Gervais) of the original UK The Office.

In this episode, Jim Halpert (John Krasinski) and Dwight Schrute (Rainn Wilson) – supposedly the branch's top two salesmen – are shocked at their disappointing results for their customer surveys. Meanwhile, Jim and Pam Beesly (Jenna Fischer) keep in touch using miniature Bluetooth headphones, and Andy Bernard (Ed Helms) and Angela Martin (Angela Kinsey) struggle to find a venue for their wedding that meets Angela's demands.

Synopsis
In the cold open, Michael Scott (Steve Carell) announces to everyone in the office that he is engaged, which is not true as Darryl Philbin (Craig Robinson) points out, privately offering to cover the co-pay if Michael seeks psychiatric help. The office prods Michael to call his mother to tell her about the engagement, which he does. His mother does not believe him, as he has apparently done this before, and he is forced to reveal the truth, disappointing everybody, particularly Kelly Kapoor (Mindy Kaling), who had just bought a white bridesmaid dress; she is now forced to return it for a partial refund.

Pam Beesly (Jenna Fischer) buys a miniature Bluetooth device for her and Jim Halpert (John Krasinski) so they can stay in touch throughout the day without being caught. Dwight Schrute (Rainn Wilson) overhears several of their conversations but assumes that Jim is talking to himself, and is further confused when Jim insists he is talking to Pam, yet acknowledges she isn't there.

During their survey reviews with Michael, Dwight and Jim are shocked to find out that their feedback is abysmal. Jim is somewhat disappointed as he was intending to use his anticipated bonus to buy his parents' home, but he does not make a big deal out of it. Dwight, on the other hand, suspects Kelly of tampering with the reports with co-conspirators, believing that Kelly is involved in a conspiracy plotting their downfall. He confronts her in the annex, with Jim closely behind in order to take him away as Kelly yells at Dwight to leave.

Jim later talks about it to Kelly, who is uncharacteristically terse with him. Listening in on the conversation, Pam points out the oddness of Kelly's manner and encourages Jim to investigate. When asking Ryan Howard (B. J. Novak) about Kelly's recent behavior, Jim notices that Ryan has a coffee mug with his face on it, which is something he had noticed Andy Bernard (Ed Helms) also had earlier. Ryan explains that the mugs were party favors at an 'America's Got Talent' viewing party Kelly had over the summer. Jim discovers that everyone in the office has one, except for him and Dwight, as they did not attend the party. He then begins to suspect that Kelly tampered with their reports out of spite, and is astonished that Dwight was right. Jim and Dwight have Michael confront her about this, and she ultimately comes clean regarding the reports. After dismissing Dwight and Jim, Michael pretends to confront Kelly about her deceit, but actually empathizes with her because he too has trouble getting people to come to his house parties.

Near the end of the day, one of Pam's friends from art school, Alex (Rich Sommer), comes to visit Pam at the corporate office. He pulls her into the conference room and tells her he thinks that she should not move back to Scranton. Jim, still listening on the Bluetooth, jokes that Alex has a crush on her, but Alex tells her that if she seriously wants to pursue a career in art, then only three months in New York is not going to do any good for her. When he leaves, Jim and Pam are left silent.

Andy shows Angela Martin (Angela Kinsey) a wedding tent he would like for their wedding. Angela hates the tent, but agrees to allow it by demanding that the location meet a series of narrow conditions which she knows only Dwight's farm meets, and Andy assents. At the end of the episode, Dwight accepts the offer to hold their wedding on his farm. Dwight further offers to meet Angela's every need, day or night.

Reception
Reviews were mostly positive. Many enjoyed the teaming up of Jim and Dwight. "Customer Survey" was voted the sixth highest-rated episode out of 26 from the fifth season, according to an episode poll at the fansite OfficeTally; the episode was rated 8.62 out of 10.

References

External links
"Customer Survey" at NBC.com

The Office (American season 5) episodes
2008 American television episodes